Bystrá is the highest mountain in the Western Tatras in Slovakia, near the Polish border. It is 2,248 meters high and surrounded by the valleys of Kamenistá, Račkova and Bystrá.

See also
Tatra Mountains

References
treking.cz
go-zakopane.com

Mountains of Slovakia
Western Tatras
Mountains of the Western Carpathians

.